Francis Xavier Gsell, OBE (30 June 1872 – 12 July 1960) was a German-born Australian Roman Catholic bishop and missionary, known as the "Bishop with 150 wives". He was born at Benfeld, Alsace in 1872. He was ordained as a priest in the order of the Missionaries of the Sacred Heart in 1896, after study in Rome.

He began active missionary work in Papua in 1900, then in 1906 re-established the Catholic Church in Palmerston (now Darwin), Northern Territory. He established an Aboriginal mission on Bathurst Island in 1910 and worked there until 1938. The local Tiwi people called him Parrakijiyali. Though unsuccessful in converting adults, he persisted with children's education and "bought" many girls promised in marriage to older men according to tribal custom. He became known as the "Bishop with 150 wives" (also the title of his autobiography) for his activities in freeing girls from such arranged marriages, thus making it possible for them to marry men of their own age. He defended the policy against criticism by Communist leader Tom Wright, and argued that "the natives are a race committing suicide" who "cannot stand the clash with modern civilisation".

Gsell was made an Officer of the Order of the British Empire (OBE) in 1935, and was Bishop of Darwin from 1938 to 1949, during which time he was influential in founding Aboriginal missions at Port Keats and Arltunga.

In 1936, Gsell was involved with establishing the Tennant Creek Catholic Church, which was dismantled and moved from its previous location at Pine Creek.

His collaboration with government promoted assimilation policies. As Bishop of Darwin he was in charge of the Catholic Church's share of the policy of child removals of children of mixed parentage now known as the Stolen Generations. He defended the practice, writing "if they had families, and if they were surrounded by that love and affection family life offers to the young even amongst primitive peoples, it might be cruel. But these creatures roam miserably around the camps and their behaviour is often worse than that of native children. It is an act of mercy to remove them as soon as possible from surroundings so insecure."

He retired to the Sacred Heart Monastery in the Sydney suburb of Kensington and died in 1960.

References

Book
 F.X. Gsell, The Bishop with 150 Wives: Fifty years as a missionary, London, 1955.

Further reading
Australian Dictionary of Biography article on Gsell
National Archives of Australia factsheet on Gsell holdings 
 M. Reidy, The bishop with 150 wives, The Record 24 Jan 2013.

1872 births
1960 deaths
People from Bas-Rhin
People from Alsace-Lorraine
20th-century Roman Catholic bishops in Australia
Roman Catholic missionaries in Australia
Australian Roman Catholic missionaries
Missionaries of the Sacred Heart
Australian Officers of the Order of the British Empire
German emigrants to Australia
Roman Catholic bishops of Darwin
Tiwi Islands
Roman Catholic missionaries in Papua New Guinea